Lloegyr is the medieval Welsh name for a region of Britain (Prydain). The exact borders are unknown, but some modern scholars hypothesize it ran south and east of a line extending from the Humber Estuary to the Severn Estuary, exclusive of Cornwall and Devon. The people of Lloegyr were called Lloegyrwys without distinction of ethnicity, the term applying to both Britons and Anglo-Saxons.

The modern form of the word is Lloegr ( or ) and it has become generalised through the passage of time to become the Welsh word for "England" as a whole, and not restricted to its original, smaller extent. The word has been anglicised and Latinised into such forms as Logres, Logris, and Loegria, among others, and is perhaps most widely recognised as the name of King Arthur's realm in the body of literature known as the Matter of Britain. The word is known to date from the 10th century or earlier, as it appears in the literary Armes Prydein.

Borders
Welsh antiquarians of the 18th and 19th centuries hypothesized that the borders of Lloegyr ran roughly on a line from the Humber Estuary, continuing southwestwards and connecting to the Severn Estuary. The line continues south across the estuary, crossing South West England such that Cornwall and Devon are excluded from Lloegyr. The division is mentioned in literature (e.g., the Welsh Triads) and is supported by the works of respected historians such as John Rhys' Celtic Britain
and John Edward Lloyd's A History of Wales from the Earliest Times to the Edwardian Conquest.

While Geoffrey of Monmouth invented fanciful characters and places in his stories of Loegria and its eponymous king Locrinus, he also showed that he was aware that the actual boundary of Lloegyr was known to run between the Humber and Severn estuaries, and that Cornwall was distinct from Loegria.

Etymology
The exact origin of the word is uncertain and has spawned a great deal of speculation. 12th century AD author Geoffrey of Monmouth offered a fanciful etymology in his Historia regum Britanniae, deriving the names of Cambria, Loegria, and Albany from the sons of Brutus of Troy: Camber, Locrinus, and Albanactus, respectively, and makes them the eponymous kings of Wales/Cambria (Camber), England/Loegria (Locrinus), and Scotland/Albany (Albanactus). In 1982, noted linguist Eric Hamp suggested that Lloeg(y)r could be derived from a Proto-Celtic compound *(p)les-okri-s, meaning 'having a nearby border, being from near the border'. Ranko Matasović prefers to see Lloegr as coming from a Brittonic collective noun *Lāikor meaning ‘warriors’, the root of which he proposes gave Old Irish láech "warrior" (though some scholars regard the Old Irish word as a loan from Late Latin lāicus ‘layman; of the people’), from a Proto-Indo-European root *leh2- "war". The suffix -wys found in numerous Welsh ethnic names, including Lloegrwys, is thought to possible be derived from the Latin suffix -ēnsēs according to some. However this is far from the consensus, as early Welsh territory and ethnic names feature similar morphology without any known Latin influence. Richard Coates makes a suggestion which agrees semantically with Matasović's, but proposes instead that it is borrowed from West Germanic (i.e. pre-Old English) *laikārōs ‘performers of exploits, players (in a military sense), warriors’.

To the Welsh, Lloegyr was a foreign land with a foreign populace, distinct from the lands and peoples of the Cymry. Cymry is the Welsh word for themselves, and historically included all of the Britons living north and west of Lloegyr, south of the Scottish firths of Clyde and Forth, and not including the people of Cornwall and Devon.

References

Sources

Medieval England
History of Wales
Terminology of the British Isles